Ali wad Hilu (died 25 November 1899) was one of the three Kalifas or lieutenants of Muhammad Ahmad (1844-1885), who styled himself the Mahdi, the others being Muhammad Sharif and 'Abd Allah ibn Muhammad.

Ali wad Hilu's followers included the Dighaym, Kianan and al-Lahiwiyin Baqqara Arabs from the Gezira region, which lies between the Blue Nile and the White Nile.
He joined the Mahdi in 1881, and his warriors were the first of the Baqqara to join the cause.
His forces participated in the sack of Khartoum in January 1885 in which General Gordon died, and which established the Mahdi's control over the Sudan.
When the British re-invaded the Sudan, at the Battle of Omdurman (2 September 1898) he led a force of 5,000 fighting under his green flag.

For the next year he remained loyal to the Khalifa 'Abd Allah as he wandered in the regions of the White Nile, Nuba Mountains and Kordofan.
Ali wad Hilu was killed at the Battle of Umm Dibaikarat (25 November 1899), where the Khalifa 'Abd Allah and other Mahdist leaders also died.

References

Sources

Year of birth missing
1899 deaths
Sudanese Muslims
People of the Mahdist War
Sudanese politicians
19th-century African people
Sudanese military personnel